Cristiano Espindola de Ávalos dos Passos (born 27 December 1977) is a former Brazilian professional footballer who played as a central defender.

Career
Ávalos played for Cascavel, Atlético Paranaense, Comercial de Ribeirão Preto, Paraná, Suwon Samsung Bluewings, Santos, São Caetano, Grêmio Barueri, Itumbiara, Monte Azul, America-RJ, Volta Redonda, Vilavelhense, São José, Remo , Brasil de Farroupilha and Cascavel.

References

External links
 

1977 births
Living people
Brazilian footballers
Brazilian expatriate footballers
Santos FC players
Paraná Clube players
Suwon Samsung Bluewings players
K League 1 players
Associação Desportiva São Caetano players
Volta Redonda FC players
Itumbiara Esporte Clube players
São José Esporte Clube players
Clube do Remo players
Grêmio Barueri Futebol players
Club Athletico Paranaense players
Expatriate footballers in South Korea
Brazilian expatriate sportspeople in South Korea
People from Cascavel
Association football defenders
FC Cascavel players
Atlético Monte Azul players
America Football Club (RJ) players
Sociedade Esportiva Recreativa e Cultural Brasil players
Comercial Futebol Clube (Ribeirão Preto) players
Sport Club do Recife players
Sportspeople from Paraná (state)